List of Christian denominations in the Republic of Malawi, Africa.power line Church

List

 Africa Continent Mission (ACM)
 Africa Light Church
 African Abraham Church
 African Assemblies of God, now Cross Life Church.
 African Baptist Assembly of Malawi, Inc.
 African Evangelical Church
 African International Church
 African Methodist Episcopal Church
 African Mother Church
 Agape Life Church International (ALCI)
 International Worship Centre (IWC)
 All for Jesus Church
 Anglican Church
 The Apostolic Church of Great Britain in Malawi
 Assemblies of God
 Baptist Convention
 Bible Believers
 Bible Faith Church
 Bible Methodist Church
 Blackman's Presbyterian Church of Africa
 Calvary Family Church
 Channels of Revival Ministries (Charem)
 Charismatic Redeemed Ministries International
 Chipangano Cha Yehova
 Chipangano Church
 Christ Citadel International Church [christ-citadel.com/Malawi/evangelism_crusade.html]
 Christadelphians
 The Christian Apostolic Church in City Zion of Malawi (Ziyoni City)
 Christian Community Church
 Church of Central Africa, Presbyterian
 Church of Christ
 The Church of Jesus Christ of Latter-day Saints
 Church of the Nazarene
 The Church Of Pentecost Malawi
 Continuing Church of God
 Cornerstone Redeemed Church (CRC)
 Cross Life Church
 Deeper Life Bible Church (The Deeper Christian Life Ministry)
 Divine Restoration International Church
 Enlightened Christian Gathering (Shepherd Bushiri) 
 Evangelical Baptist Church
 Evangelical Church of Malawi/Nyasaland
 Evangelical Lutheran Church of Malawi (ELCM)
 Evangelical Presbyterian Church of Malawi
 Evangelical Truth Church
 Evangelistic New Exodus church of God and Mission
 Faith Assembly
 Faith of God Church
 Forward in Faith Church
 Free Baptist Church
 Free Church
 Free Methodist Church
 Full Gospel Church Of God
 Glory Zone Ministry
 Good News Mission Church
 Good Samaritan Pentecostal Church
 Gospel Assembly Church
 Glorious Ministry International Church
 Hermon Temple Church
 Holy Cross
 Jehovah's Witnesses (Mboni Za Yehova)
 Jesus Followers
 Jesus Pentecostal Church International
 Kalibu kwa Jesu
 Kingdom Gospel Church
 Last Church of God and his Christ
 Life Changers International Church
 Living Christian Church
 Living Promise Church
 Living Waters
 Loyalty House International (formerly Lighthouse Chapel International ) 
 Lutheran Church of Central Africa Malawi Synod
 Malamulo Church
 Monrovia Church
 Mt. Beula Apostolic Church
 New Exodus Church of God and Missions
 New/United Apostolic Faith Church
 Peace with God Worldwide International
 Pentecostal Assemblies of Malawi
 Pentecostal Christian Church (PCC) under Pentecostal Christian Ministries
 Pentecostal Church
 Pentecostal Holiness Church (under International Pentecostal Holiness Church)
 Pentecostal Pillar of fire Ministries
 Power of Reformation Church (PRC)
 Power Line Church (PLC)
 Providence Industrial Mission (PIM)
 Raised For a Purpose Ministries (RFP) 
 Reformed Presbyterian Church of Malawi
 Revival Christian Church (peace ministries church)
 Righteousness Christian church
 Roman Catholic Church
 Royal Priesthood Ministries International
 Salvation Army
 Seventh-day Adventist Church
 Seventh Day Baptists
 Step To Jesus church and Ministries International
 Sons of God
 United Methodist Church
 United Pentecostal Church of Malawi-(UPC) 
 Vineyard Church International
 The Way church Blantyre Malawi
 Winners Chapel
 Word Alive Ministries International
 Word of Faith Temple International Bible Faith Church
 Word of Faith temple International Ministries
 Word of Life Tabernacle Church
 Worldwide Church of God
 World Revival Ministries
 Zambezi Evangelical Church
 ZAOGA 
 Zion City Church

References

Sources
This list is based on field research carried out by the Centre for Social Research (CSR) at the University of Malawi.

Christian denominations in Malawi
African initiated churches
Malawi